Spotting may refer to:

Medicine
 Vaginal spotting, light bleeding that is not a menstrual period

Photography:
 Aircraft spotting
 Bus spotting
 Car spotting
 Train spotting

Pastimes:
 Spots (cannabis), a method of smoking cannabis

Physical activities:
 Spotting (climbing)
 Spotting (dance technique), a technique used by dancers to maintain control while executing turns
 Spotting (weight training)

Other:
 Artillery spotting or bombardment spotting, observing the result of artillery or shell fire and providing corrective targeting data to the firer
 Spotting (photography)
 Spotting (filmography), the process of determining the location of the musical score of a film
 Car spotting (disambiguation)